The black flounder (Rhombosolea retiaria) is a flatfish of the genus Rhombosolea, found around New Zealand in shallow enclosed waters and coastal freshwater lakes. Its adult length ranges from 20 to 45 cm.

References

 
 
 Tony Ayling & Geoffrey Cox, Collins Guide to the Sea Fishes of New Zealand,  (William Collins Publishers Ltd, Auckland, New Zealand 1982) 

black flounder
Endemic freshwater fish of New Zealand
black flounder